Banco Ambrosiano was an Italian bank that collapsed in 1982. At the centre of the bank's failure was its chairman, Roberto Calvi, and his membership in the illegal former Masonic Lodge Propaganda Due (aka P2). The Vatican-based Institute for the Works of Religion, commonly known as the Vatican Bank, was Banco Ambrosiano's main shareholder. The Vatican Bank was also accused of funnelling covert United States funds to the Polish trade union Solidarity and to the Nicaraguan Contras through Banco Ambrosiano.

Members 

 Franco Ratti, chairman
 Carlo Canesi, senior manager then chairman of Banco Ambrosiano Holding starting from 1965
 Roberto Calvi, general manager of Banco Ambrosiano since 1971, appointed chairman from 1975 to his death in June 1982; he was often referred to as "God's Banker" because of his close financial ties with the Vatican
 Paul Marcinkus, president of Vatican Bank (aka "Istituto per le Opere di Religione"), had been a director of Ambrosiano Overseas, based in Nassau, Bahamas
 Carlo De Benedetti became deputy-chairman for less than two months, after Roberto Calvi's trial
 Nuovo Banco Ambrosiano is under Giovanni Bazoli
 Carlos Guido Natal Coda, head of the Argentine branch of Banco Ambrosiano (Coda was the predecessor of Emilio Massera as Commander-in-Chief of the Argentine Navy)

Before 1981 

The Banco Ambrosiano was founded in Milan in 1896 by Giuseppe Tovini, a Catholic lawyer and banker from Valle Camonica, and was named after Saint Ambrose, the fourth century archbishop of the city. Tovini's purpose was to create a Catholic bank as a counterbalance to Italy's "lay" banks, and its goals were "serving moral organisations, pious works, and religious bodies set up for charitable aims." The bank came to be known as the "priests' bank"; one chairman was Franco Ratti, nephew to Pope Pius XI. In the 1960s, the bank began to expand its business, opening a holding company in Luxembourg in 1963 which came to be known as Banco Ambrosiano Holding. This was under the direction of Carlo Canesi, then a senior manager, and from 1965 chairman. His deputy was Roberto Calvi.

In 1971, Calvi became general manager, and in 1975 he was appointed chairman. Calvi expanded Ambrosiano's interests further; these included creating a number of off-shore companies in the Bahamas and South America; a controlling interest in the Banca Cattolica del Veneto; and funds for the publishing house Rizzoli to finance the Corriere della Sera newspaper (giving Calvi control behind the scenes for the benefit of his associates in the P2 masonic lodge). Calvi was also a friend of American Archbishop Paul Marcinkus president of the Istituto per le Opere di Religione (the formal name of the Vatican Bank), and involved both the IOR and Marcinkus in his dealings. 

Ambrosiano also provided funds for political parties in Italy, and for both the Somoza dictatorship in Nicaragua and its Sandinista opposition. There are also rumours that it provided money for Solidarity in Poland. At Lugano, Banco del Gottardo, which was founded in 1957 with Dr. August Gansser-Burckhardt as president, became Banco Ambrosiano's Swiss arm in 1963 with Swiss managers and a 45% stake indirectly through the Banco Ambrosiano Holding S. A., Luxembourg, which Banco Ambosiano held a 70% stake, and was the linchpin of Calvi's offshore system with branches established in Nassau (Bahamas) and Luxembourg in the 1970s and after its failure Sumitomo Bank obtained Gotthardt Bank in 1984 and added the Monaco branch in 1994.

Calvi used his complex network of overseas banks and companies to move money out of Italy, to inflate share prices, and to secure massive unsecured loans. In 1978, the Banca d'Italia (Bank of Italy) produced a report on Ambrosiano that predicted future disaster and led to criminal investigations. However, soon afterward the investigating Milanese magistrate, Alessandrini, was killed by a left-wing terrorist group, while the Bank of Italy official who superintended the inspection, Mario Sarcinelli, found himself imprisoned on charges that were later dismissed.

After 1981 
In 1981, police raided the office of Propaganda Due Masonic lodge to apprehend the Worshipful Master Licio Gelli and uncover further evidence against Roberto Calvi. Calvi was arrested, put on trial, and sentenced to four years in prison. However, he was released pending an appeal and retained his position at the bank. Other alarming developments followed: Carlo de Benedetti of Olivetti bought into the bank and became deputy chairman, only to leave two months later after receiving Mafia threats and lack of co-operation from Calvi. His replacement, a longtime employee named Roberto Rosone, was wounded in a Mafia shooting incident. The criminal organization responsible for this shooting was the Banda della Magliana (Magliana Gang) which had taken over Rome's underworld in the late 1970s, and has been related to various political events of the anni di piombo (years of lead).

In 1982, it was discovered that the bank was unable to account for $1.287 billion (equivalent to $ in present-day terms). Calvi fled the country on a false passport, and Rosone arranged for the Bank of Italy to take over. Calvi's personal secretary, Graziella Corrocher, left a note denouncing Calvi before leaping to her death from her office window. Calvi's body was found hanging from Blackfriars Bridge in London on June 18 (see Roberto Calvi#Death).

During July 1982, funds to the off-shore interests were cut off, leading to their collapse, and in August the bank was replaced by the Nuovo Banco Ambrosiano under Giovanni Bazoli. Pope John Paul II pledged full transparency regarding the bank's links to the Vatican and brought in lay bankers including German financial expert Hermann Abs, a move that was publicly criticized by Simon Wiesenthal, due to Abs' role as top banker to Nazi Germany from 1938 to 1945. There was much argument over who should take responsibility for losses incurred by the Old Ambrosiano's off-shore companies, and the Holy See (Vatican) eventually agreed to pay out a substantial sum without accepting liability.

In April 1992, Carlo De Benedetti, former deputy chairman of Banco Ambrosiano, and 32 other people were convicted of fraud by a Milan court in connection with the bank's collapse. Benedetti was sentenced to six years and four months in prison, but the sentence was overturned in April 1998 by the Court of Cassation.

In 1994, former Socialist Prime Minister Bettino Craxi was indicted in the Banco Ambrosiano case, along with Licio Gelli, head of Propaganda Due, and former Justice minister Claudio Martelli. In April 1998, the Court of Cassation confirmed a 12-year sentence for Licio Gelli for the Ambrosiano crash.

Clearstream scandal 

Just before the media revealed the Ambrosiano scandal, Gérard Soisson, the manager of the transaction clearing company Clearstream, was found dead in Corsica, two months after Ernest Backes' dismissal from Clearstream in May 1983. Banco Ambrosiano was one of the many banks to have unpublished accounts in Clearstream. Backes, formerly the third-ranking officer of Clearstream and a primary source for Denis Robert's book on Clearstream's scandal, Revelation$, claims he "was fired because (he) knew too much about the Ambrosiano scandal. When Soisson died, the Ambrosiano affair wasn't yet known as a scandal. (After it was revealed) I realized that Soisson and I had been at the crossroads. We moved all those transactions known later in the scandal to Lima and other branches. Nobody even knew there was a Banco Ambrosiano branch in Lima and other South American countries."

As of 2005, the Italian justice has opened up again the investigation concerning the murder of Roberto Calvi, Ambrosiano's chairman, but it asked the support of Ernest Backes and will investigate Gerard Soisson's death, according to Lucy Komisar. Licio Gelli, the headmaster of P2 Masonic Lodge, and the mafioso Giuseppe "Pippo" Calò are being prosecuted for the assassination of Roberto Calvi.

Falklands war involvement
France prohibited deliveries of Exocet AM39 missiles purchased by Peru to avoid the possibility of Peru giving them to Argentina, because they knew that payment would be made with a credit card from the Central Bank of Peru, but British intelligence had detected that the guarantee was a deposit of two hundred million dollars from the Banco Ambrosiano Andino, an owned subsidiary of the Banco Ambrosiano. An Italian investigation into Propaganda Due's involvement in the arms trade  uncovered a contract for 52 Exocets signed by Carlos Alberto Corti, an Argentinian naval officer and member of P2.

Roberto Calvi's 1982 murder 
David Yallop believes that Calvi, with the assistance of P2, may have been responsible for the death of Albino Luciani who, as Pope John Paul I, was planning a reform of Vatican finances. This is one of many conspiracy theories about Luciani, who died of a heart attack. However, Calvi's family maintains that he was an honest man manipulated by others.  According to the magistrates who indicted Licio Gelli, P2's "Venerable Master", and Giuseppe Calò for Calvi's murder, Gelli would have ordered his death to punish him for embezzlement of his and the mafia's money, while the mafia wanted to stop him from revealing the way Calvi helped it in money laundering.

See also 
 Banda della Magliana
 The Bankers of God: The Calvi Affair

Notes

References

General references

Further reading

External links 
 Links to several newsarticles about the scandal

Defunct banks of Italy
Political scandals in Italy
History of the Sicilian Mafia
Economic history of the Holy See
Banks established in 1896
Italian companies established in 1896
Banks disestablished in 1982
Bank failures